The 1995 Paris–Nice was the 53rd edition of the Paris–Nice cycle race and was held from 5 March to 12 March 1995. The race started at Fontenay-sous-Bois and finished at the Col d'Èze. The race was won by Laurent Jalabert of the ONCE team.

General classification

References

1995
1995 in road cycling
1995 in French sport
March 1995 sports events in Europe